Corvallis  may refer to:

Places
 Corvallis, Montana, USA
 Corvallis, Oregon, USA

Education
 Corvallis High School (California)
 Corvallis High School (Montana)
 Corvallis High School (Oregon)

Others
Cessna 350 Corvalis light aircraft
Cessna 400 Corvalis light aircraft
Corvallis Gazette-Times
Corvallis Knights, baseball team
Corvallis Municipal Airport
Corvallis Pride, women's football team